Public primary and secondary education in Coral Springs, Florida is handled by the Broward County Public Schools district (BCPS).  BCPS operates three high schools, four middle schools and 12 elementary schools within Coral Springs. Three charter schools and seven private schools also operate within the city.

High schools
Coral Glades High School
Coral Springs High School
J. P. Taravella High School

A portion of the city limits is zoned to Marjory Stoneman Douglas High School in Parkland.

In addition the community is in the service area of the magnet school Pompano Beach High School.

Middle schools
Coral Springs Middle School
Forest Glen Middle School
Ramblewood Middle School
Sawgrass Springs Middle School

A portion of the city limits is zoned to Westglades Middle School in Parkland.

Elementary schools
Coral Park Elementary School
Coral Springs Elementary School
Country Hills Elementary School
Eagle Ridge Elementary School
Forest Hills Elementary School
James S. Hunt Elementary School
Maplewood Elementary School
Parkside Elementary School
Park Springs Elementary School
Ramblewood Elementary School
Riverside Elementary School
Westchester Elementary School

A portion of the city limits is in the geographic priority area for Heron Heights Elementary in Parkland, while the other choice is Park Trails Elementary in Parkland, and with Riverglades, also in Parkland being the backup choice.

Charter schools
Broward Community Charter School
Broward Community Charter School West
Coral Springs Charter School
Imagine Charter School at Broward
Renaissance Charter School At Coral Springs

Private schools
Academy High School
Atlantis Academy
Coral Baptist School
Coral Springs Christian Academy
Creative Child Learning Center
North Broward Preparatory Schools 
Saint Andrew Catholic School
The Day School at Coral Springs

Additionally, three public schools in neighboring Parkland serve portions of Coral Springs:

Marjory Stoneman Douglas High School
Westglades Middle School
Park Trails Elementary School

References

 
Coral Springs, Florida
Coral Springs